Shahriari-ye Sofla (also Romanized as Shahrīārī-ye Soflá; also known as Chāh-e Shahrīārī, Chāh-i-Shahryāri, Dasht-e Shahrīārī, and Shahryārī) is a village in Chahak Rural District, in the Central District of Khatam County, Yazd Province, Iran. At the 2006 census, its population was 151, in 41 families.

References 

Populated places in Khatam County